The Anix is a former American rock band and currently a solo electronic project run by Los Angeles-based music producer Brandon Smith who was originally the band's frontman.

History

Early years (2001–2007)
The Anix was formed in 2001 by Brandon Smith, Bryan Lareau and Oscar Gutierrez. The band made various albums along the years (A Division of You, Digital Rock etc.) but they didn't receive much recognition. The band released their debut studio album, titled "An Illusion of Time" in 2004. The band's first label released album was "Play, Dance, Repeat" released in April 2005.

Gaining recognition and release of "Sleepwalker" (2008–2017) 
The Anix's first critically acclaimed album was "Demolition City". The album was released in 2008 under Chamberlain records. A review was published about the album on Billboard Magazine's vol.120 no.22 issue. It praised the band's style of using 80's music as an inspiration.

The band played live shows in Illinois and Chicago with artist's Cromwell, Comasoft. In 2009 the band first played in overseas. Along with Apoptygma Berzerk, the band played various live shows in Germany.

The band then signed with Cleopatra Records and released their next album - "Sleepwalker". Released in 2011, the album received praise in the gaming community. The song "Warning Signs" was included in the soundtrack of Mass Effect: Paragon Lost. Smith said that the band is often inspired by film adaptations of graphic novels, like The Dark Knight and Sin City.

The band's next album "Ephemeral" was released in 2017. The album contained elements from techno and dance music; a first for the band.

Turning into a solo project (2018–present)

After the release of "Ephemeral" the band turned into a solo project with Brandon being the only member. He signed with electronic music label FiXT and released his debut single "Fight the Future". His sixth album, titled "Shadow_Movement", was released on 18 October 2018.

After releasing various singles Brandon released his seventh studio album "Hologram" on 10 October 2019. He released his eighth studio album, "Graphite", on 26 June 2020.

The Revenge LP, with 15 tracks, was released January 14, 2022. It includes guest appearances by Julien K, InHuman, and Amir Derakh (Julien K, Rough Cutt).

In July 15, 2022, Demolition City was remastered and released. The album contains all the previous songs (excluding "The Lowdown of a Fool") and previously unreleased demos and songs.

Members

Current members
 Brandon Smith – vocals, guitar, keyboards, bass, programming (2001–present)

(Some of) Former members
 Oscar Gutierrez – drums (2001–2005)
 Bryan Lareau – guitar, bass, backing vocals (2001–2006)
 Chris Yarber – bass, synthesizer (2004–2008)
 Nik Lawhorn – guitar (2004–?)
 Logan Smith – drums (2005–2018)
 Greg Nabours – synthesizer (2008–?)
 Chris Dinger – guitar (?–2018)
 Nikolas Musolino – guitar

Discography

Studio albums

Remix albums

 Change (Remixes) (2003)
 Dangerous (Remixes) (2005)

Compilation albums 

 Rare And Unreleased (2009)
 Glass (Deconstructed) (2012)
 Black Space (Deconstructed) (2019)

Others

Singles

As featured artist
Pers Mantrum - Loading 99
Fury Weekend - Illumination
We Are Pigs - Brazen
Julien-K - Desperation Day
Nouveau Arcade feat. Cordélia - Apart
HU3M3N - T3MPT3D
Intrelock - Reminisce
Fury Weekend - Delirious

Music videos

References
 

Electronic music groups from California
2000 establishments in California